This is a list of an approximate rendering of the names of the village-level divisions of the province of Jiangsu, People's Republic of China (PRC) into a romanized form derived from Standard Mandarin Pinyin.

Yancheng

Xiangshui

Chenjiagang

References

 Villages
Jiangsu